Patrick Cawley (26 December 1904 – 18 December 1968) was an Irish Fine Gael politician. He was elected on his sixth attempt, to Dáil Éireann as a Teachta Dála (TD) for the Galway South constituency at the 1951 general election. He lost his seat at the 1954 general election.

References

1904 births
1968 deaths
Fine Gael TDs
Members of the 14th Dáil
Politicians from County Galway